The September 2017 Democratic Party held a presidential election on 1 September 2017 to choose a replacement for the previous president Renho, who resigned on 27 July 2017.

Seiji Maehara was elected as the new president.

Candidates 

Seiji Maehara, former party president (2005–06) and Minister of Foreign Affairs (2010-11).
Yukio Edano, former Chief Cabinet Minister (2011) and Minister of Economy, Trade and Industry (2012-12).

Results 
Voting was held on 1 September, following a campaign period from 21 August.

References 

2017 elections in Japan
Political party leadership elections in Japan
September 2017 events in Japan
Democratic Party (Japan, 2016) leadership election